Chanaka Wijesinghe (born 4 February 1982) is a Sri Lankan cricketer. He has played in more than 140 first-class matches since making debut his in the 2002/03 season. He made his Twenty20 debut on 17 August 2004, for Ragama Cricket Club in the 2004 SLC Twenty20 Tournament.

References

External links
 

1982 births
Living people
Sri Lankan cricketers
Batticaloa District cricketers
Kandurata cricketers
Kandy Customs Sports Club cricketers
Kandy Youth Cricket Club cricketers
Moors Sports Club cricketers
Nondescripts Cricket Club cricketers
Ragama Cricket Club cricketers
Sportspeople from Kandy